I Could Rule the World If I Could Only Get the Parts is an EP by the Waitresses. It includes the singles "Christmas Wrapping" (1981) and "Square Pegs" (1982); the latter was the theme song of the television series of the same name.

"I Could Rule the World If I Could Only Get the Parts" is a live cover (recorded from a Westwood One radio broadcast) of a song by Tin Huey, the prior band of Waitresses founder Chris Butler.

Track listing
All songs written by Chris Butler and arranged by the Waitresses
"Christmas Wrapping" – 5:25
"Bread and Butter" – 4:11
"Square Pegs" – 3:06
"The Smartest Person I Know" – 3:33
"I Could Rule the World If I Could Only Get the Parts" – 3:46

Personnel
Patty Donahue – vocals
Tracy Wormworth – bass
Billy Ficca – drums
Chris Butler – guitar
Dan Klayman – organ
Mars Williams – saxophone
with:
Dave Buck – trumpet on "Christmas Wrapping"

Charts

Trivia
 A backwards message was inserted in the middle of the track "The Smartest Person I Know." Singer Patty Donahue says: "Anyone who worries about subliminal messages on pop records is a fool. Everyone else have a nice day."

References

1982 EPs
The Waitresses EPs
Polydor Records EPs